Kenyen Ray Brown is an American attorney who served as the United States Attorney for the Southern District of Alabama from 2009 to 2017.

See also
 2017 dismissal of U.S. attorneys
 Kenyen Brown Joins Hughes Hubbard & Reed as Partner

References

External links
 Official profile at Hughes Hubbard & Reed

Living people
United States Attorneys for the Southern District of Alabama
Alabama Democrats
Lawyers from Detroit
University of Alabama alumni
University of Tennessee College of Law alumni
African-American lawyers
Year of birth missing (living people)
21st-century African-American people